Zoran Boshkovski (born 11 December 1967) is a retired Macedonian professional footballer.

Club career
Boshkovski was twice the top scorer of the Macedonian First Football League, scoring 21 goals during the 1993–94 season and 20 goals during the 1995–96 season, with FK Sileks.

International career
Boshkovski was the first player to score for the newly created North Macedonia national football team, just three minutes into its first international, against Slovenia on 13 October 1993. Macedonia went on to win 4–1. Boshkovski made 16 appearances and scored five goals for the North Macedonia national football team from 1993 to 1996. His final international was a May 1996 friendly match against Bulgaria.

References

External links
Profile at MacedonianFootball.com 

1967 births
Living people
Footballers from Skopje
Association football forwards
Yugoslav footballers
Macedonian footballers
North Macedonia international footballers
FK Vardar players
FK Pelister players
FK Sileks players
FK Rabotnički players
KF Shkëndija players
Macedonian First Football League players
Macedonian football managers
FK Teteks managers